Hot potato is a party game that involves players gathering in a circle and tossing a small object such as a beanbag or even a real potato to each other while music plays. The player who is holding the object when the music stops is eliminated.

Origins
The origins of the hot potato game are not clear. However, it may go back as far as 1888 when Sidney Oldall Addy's Glossary of Sheffield Words describes a game in which a number of people sit in a row, or in chairs round a parlor. In this game, a lit candle is handed to the first person, who says:

The one in whose hand the light expires has to pay the forfeit.

See also
 Bagholder
 Musical chairs
Pass the parcel
 Passing the buck

References

Children's games
Party games